Sideroxylon nadeaudii is a species of plant in the family Sapotaceae. It is endemic to Tahiti, French Polynesia.

Taxonomy
This species was first described as Palaquium nadeaudii by Emmanuel Drake del Castillo (early 1890s) and then transferred to the genus Nesoluma in 1938. As a result of the phylogenetic analyses, this species was transferred to the genus Sideroxylon in 2007.

References

Flora of the Society Islands
nadeaudii
Data deficient plants
Taxonomy articles created by Polbot
Endemic flora of French Polynesia
Taxobox binomials not recognized by IUCN